Gerri Sinclair serves as the Innovation Commissioner for the Government of British Columbia. She was appointed in July 2020.

Sinclair previously served as a Managing Director at Kensington Capital Partners and was the leader of the firm's Vancouver office, managing the $100 million BC Technology fund and the $91 million BC Renaissance Fund. She has also served as a Director on the Boards of numerous public and private companies and organizations.

Sinclair holds a Ph.D. in Renaissance Drama as well as an honorary Doctor of Science in Computing Science from the University of British Columbia. Sinclair was the founding Director of the ExCITE lab at Simon Fraser University, where she was an English professor. She was the founder and CEO of NCompass Labs Inc, which was acquired by Microsoft in 2001. She was General Manager for the MSN Canada subsidiary.

Sinclair has served on a number of Canadian national and provincial advisory boards, including the National Advisory Council on the Information Highway and the National Broadband Task Force.  She was formerly President of the British Columbia Premier's Technology Council.

Awards
Sinclair was ranked in both 2016 and 2017 to the “Vancouver Power 50”, an annual list of the most powerful people in the city. She was named one of the top Women of Influence in 2017 by BC Business Magazine and one of the top 150 Women in Canada. In 2018, she received the BC Technology Industry Association’s Bill Thompson Lifetime Achievement Award, and received a Lifetime Achievement Award as most Influential Woman in Business in Vancouver in 2020.

References

External links

 Masters of Digital Media Program Biography
 BusinessWeek: From Shakespeare to Software
 Dr Gerri Sinclair interviewed by Microsoft's Channel 10
 Microsoft Canada appoints Gerri Sinclair as New General Manager of MSN.ca
 British Columbia Premier's Technology Council Members
 Canda 150 Women
 BC Business 2017 Women of Influence - Gerri Sinclair
 Gerri Sinclair of Kensington Capital

Living people
Businesspeople from Vancouver
Canadian business executives
Canadian women business executives
Corporate executives
Women corporate executives
University of British Columbia alumni
Year of birth missing (living people)